Amolops hainanensis is a species of frog in the family Ranidae that is endemic to southwestern and central Hainan, China. Its natural habitats are subtropical or tropical moist lowland forests and rivers.
It is threatened by habitat loss. It is a sister taxa to both A. torrentis and A. daiyunnensis.

References

Amphibians of China
hainanensis
Amphibians described in 1900
Endemic fauna of Hainan
Taxonomy articles created by Polbot
Endangered Fauna of China